Qarwa Ranra (Quechua qarwa pale, yellowish, golden, "yellowish stony ground", hispaniczed spelling Carhuaranra) is a mountain in the La Viuda mountain range in the Andes of Peru, about  high. It is situated in the Lima Region, Huarochirí Province, on the border of the districts of Carampoma and Matucana. It lies northwest of Yana Yana.

References 

Mountains of Peru
Mountains of Lima Region